HMS Loch Achanalt was a  of the Royal Navy that was loaned to and served with the Royal Canadian Navy during World War II. After the war she was transferred to the Royal New Zealand Navy and renamed Pukaki.

Service history

As Loch Achanalt (K424)
Loaned to the Royal Canadian Navy, the ship was commissioned on 31 July 1944, and joined the 6th Canadian Escort Group at Derry for convoy defence and anti-submarine operations in the North-Western Approaches.

In January 1945 the 6th Escort Group was transferred to convoy defence duties in the English Channel based at Portsmouth. From 14 March to 20 April, the group were deployed from Plymouth to the English Channel and South-Western Approaches on convoy defence duties. Later in April they sailed to Halifax for convoy defence duties. Following the German surrender, the Group was disbanded on 23 May 1945. Loch Achanalt was returned to the Royal Navy in July and put into reserve at Sheerness.

In March 1948 Loch Achanalt was sold to Royal New Zealand Navy with five other Loch-class frigates. On 13 September 1948 she was formally transferred and renamed HMNZS Pukaki (F424).

As Pukaki (F424)
On 15 October 1948 Pukaki sailed from Portland with three other Loch-class frigates, arriving at Auckland in January 1949 to join the 11th Frigate Flotilla for patrols and exercises.

On 25 June 1950 Pukaki was placed at the disposal of the UN Forces in Korea. In August Pukaki and sister-ship  arrived at Sasebo to join the UN naval command. Initially attached to Task Group 96.5 for escort duties between Japan and Korea, in September she was transferred to Task Group 90.7 to support of landings by the US 1st Marine Division at Inchon, rejoining Task Group 96.5 in October to protect minesweeping operations prior to the landings at Wonsan. In November she was relieved by the frigate  and returned to Auckland to refit, after which she was placed in reserve.

Recommissioned in December 1952 for service in the 11th Frigate Flotilla, Pukaki was assigned to detached service with the Royal Navy's Far East Fleet 4th Frigate Squadron based at Singapore in September 1953. In January 1954 the frigate was deployed in the Yellow Sea for trade protection and as back-up to UN forces in Korea if required. In May she was transferred to Singapore for anti-terrorist operations in the Malayan Emergency, returning to Auckland in September.

She rejoined the 4th Frigate Squadron in the Far East Fleet in June 1955, for trade protection and Korean coast guard ship duties, while also carrying out joint exercises with United States Navy ships, returning to Auckland in May 1956. In December she escorted the supply vessel  during the initial stage of the journey to McMurdo Sound in Antarctica.

In 1957 and 1958 the ship was deployed as a weather reporting ship during the "Operation Grapple" nuclear tests at Christmas Island. Between 1959 and 1962 she once more joined the Far East Fleet for SEATO exercises and patrols. From 1963 to 1965 she supported the United States "Operation Deep Freeze" Antarctic operations. Pukaki alternated with an American  DER picket frigate operating from Dunedin in summer months to track United States Navy Lockheed C-130 Hercules deployments and other flights from Harewood airport in Christchurch to McMurdo Base in the Ross Dependency, offering the potential for search and rescue in the Southern Ocean and service to the weather station on Campbell Island. Sea conditions probably shortened by two years the service life of Pukaki and the other surviving Loch-class frigate, Rotoiti. This forced the United States Navy to deploy two Edsall-class DERs to Dunedin for the final three deployments in 1966–68.

Put into reserve in May 1965 Pukaki was sold in October. The ship was towed to Hong Kong and scrapped in January 1966.

See also
 Frigates of the Royal New Zealand Navy

References

Notes

Bibliography
 Service Histories of Royal Navy Warships : Loch Achanalt
 McDougall, R J (1989) New Zealand Naval Vessels. Page 37–41. Government Printing Office.

External links

 

Ships of the Royal Canadian Navy
1944 ships
Loch-class frigates
Ships built in Leith
World War II frigates of the United Kingdom